13 Moons is a 2002 comedy-drama film directed by Alexandre Rockwell. The title is a reference to the saying of a minor character's mother, who suggested that if nights of the full moon are strange, then "this must be the night of thirteen moons."

Plot
The film opens with a clown (Buscemi) whose wife (Beals) and stripper girlfriend (Parsons) just discovered each other's existence. When his wife is jailed for trying to run him over, the stripper, the clown and his partner (Dinklage) contact a bail bondsman (Proval) whose wife just left their sickly son Timmy (Wolff) in his care. On the way, they are accosted by a crazed drug addict named Slovo (Stormare) who is hit by a car soon after.

At the jail, the five meet up with an angry record producer (Mitchell) and the girlfriend he believes to be pregnant (Rollins) whom he plans to make a star, despite her protestations of not having any talent. Also along for the ride are two priests (Vince and Williams), one of whom has begun to doubt the wisdom of the Roman Catholic Church, and who are trailing to bail out a third priest (Messina) who was goaded into a fight by the proprietor of a strip club (Rockwell).

When the nine characters intersect, they discover that Timmy has a defective kidney and is slowly dying. However, he has just been paged, as there is a donor at the hospital: Slovo. The three caring characters immediately take Timmy to the hospital, with the others in pursuit. By the time they arrive, Slovo partially recovered and escapes to wander the streets, cheerfully ignoring his internal bleeding and must be tracked down, before both he and Timmy die.

Cast and characters
Jennifer Beals as Suzi
Elizabeth Bracco as Louise Potter
Steve Buscemi as Bananas The Clown
Peter Dinklage as Binky
Daryl Mitchell as Lenny
Karyn Parsons as Lily
David Proval as Mo Potter
Rose Rollins as Sanandra
Peter Stormare as Slovo
Pruitt Taylor Vince as Owen
Gareth Williams as Thad
Austin Wolff as Timmy
Francesco Messina as Robert
Sam Rockwell as Rick
Matthew Sussman as Doctor Monroe
Lester Speight as Vincent

References

External links
 
 

2002 films
2002 comedy-drama films
American comedy-drama films
2000s English-language films
Films directed by Alexandre Rockwell
Gold Circle Films films
2000s American films